Kumaraguru is a 1946 Indian Tamil language film produced by Chitrakala Movietone and directed by Jyotish Sinha. The film featured D. S. Krishna Iyer, Jayabala and others.

Cast 
The following list was adapted from the database of Film News Anandan.
D. S. Krishna Iyer
Jayabala
Vidwan Mani
Radha
Thanjavur Mani

Production 
This is the first film produced by Chitrakala Movietone a company that was located in Madurai. The company was owned by S. M. Nayagam who also was the producer of this film. Kumaraguru was directed by Jyotish Sinha. Prabhakar handled the cinematography.

References 

1940s Tamil-language films
Indian black-and-white films